The Napa Valley Unified School District (NVUSD) is a public school district located in Napa County, California.  It was the first school district to purchase a plug-in hybrid diesel school bus. The school district, founded on 1965, serves the cities of  Napa,  American Canyon, and Yountville. During the 2018–19 school year, it served 17,849 students.

Schools
NVUSD has 18 elementary schools, 5 middle schools, 5 high schools, an independent studies school, and adult education.

 Middle schools
 Harvest Middle School
 Harvest Middle School is an English-Spanish immersion school. In spring 2022 Harvest Middle School is to close and River is to become the new English-Spanish school.
 River Middle School
 Celeste Akiu served as principal of River Middle School until 2018, when Peter Hartnack replaced her. The school was supposed to move into its current facility, the former Salvador Elementary School, in 2018, but there were construction delays. It finally moved into its current location in 2020. In 2022 River Middle will take the English-Spanish immersion program from the closed Harvest Middle.

References

External links
 Official website

School districts in Napa County, California
1965 establishments in California
School districts established in 1965